Bissau is the capital and largest city of Guinea-Bissau.  it had a population of 492,004. Bissau is located on the Geba River estuary, off the Atlantic Ocean, and is Guinea-Bissau's largest city, major port, and its administrative and military centre.

Etymology
The term Bissau may have come from the name of a clan N'nssassun, in its plural form Bôssassun. Intchassu (Bôssassu) was the name given to the nephew of King Mecau—the first sovereign of the island of Bissau—, son of his sister Pungenhum. Bôssassu formed a clan of the Papel peoples.

History

The city was founded in 1687 by Portugal as a fortified port and trading center. In 1942 the capital of Portuguese Guinea was transferred from Bolama to Bissau.

After the declaration of independence by the anti-colonial guerrillas of PAIGC in 1973, the capital of the rebel territories was declared to be Madina do Boe, while Bissau remained the colonial capital. When Portugal granted independence, following the military coup of April 25 in Lisbon, Bissau became the capital of the new independent state.

Bissau was the scene of intense fighting during the beginning and end of the Guinea-Bissau Civil War in 1998 and 1999.

Geography and climate

Bissau is located at 11°52' North, 15°36' West (11.86667, -15.60) GNS: Country Files, on the Geba River estuary, off the Atlantic Ocean. The land surrounding Bissau is extremely low-lying, and the river is accessible to ocean-going vessels despite its modest discharge for about  beyond the city.

Bissau has a tropical savanna climate (Köppen Aw), not quite wet enough to qualify as a tropical monsoon climate (Am) but much wetter than most climates of its type.

Demographics

At the 1979 census, Bissau had a population of 109,214. By the 2015 census Bissau had a population of 492,004.

Economy
Bissau is the country's largest city, major port, educational, administrative, industrial and military center. Peanuts, hardwoods, copra, palm oil, milk products, and rubber are the chief products. Bissau is also the main city of the fishing and agricultural industry in the country.

Transportation

Air 
Bissau is served by Osvaldo Vieira International Airport, the country's sole international airport, which currently offers flights from six different airlines.

Highways 
The main highway connecting Bissau to the rest of the nation and the continent is the Trans–West African Coastal Highway. There are also many smaller national highways that connect to other big cities such as Bafatá and Gabu.

Education
The main secondary school institutions in Bissau are the National Lyceum Kwame N'Krumah and the Bethel-Bissau Adventist School. The main higher education institutions in the city are the Amílcar Cabral University, the Catholic University of Guinea Bissau, and the Jean Piaget University of Guinea-Bissau. 

The city of Bissau still has two international schools:
 Escola Portuguesa da Guiné-Bissau
 Escola Portuguesa Passo a Passo

Culture 
Attractions include the Portuguese-built Fortaleza de São José da Amura barracks from the 18th century, containing Amílcar Cabral's mausoleum, the Pidjiguiti Memorial to the dockers killed in the Bissau Dockers' Strike on August 3, 1959, the Guinea-Bissau National Arts Institute, Bissau New Stadium and local beaches.

Many buildings in the city were ruined during the Guinea-Bissau Civil War (1998–1999), including the Guinea-Bissau Presidential Palace and the Bissau French Cultural Centre (now rebuilt), and the city centre is still underdeveloped. Because of the large populations of Muslims in Bissau, Ramadan is also an important celebration.

Sports 
Football is the most popular sport in the country, as well as in the city. Many teams are based in the city, such as: UD Internacional, SC de Bissau, SC Portos de Bissau, Sport Bissau e Benfica, and FC Cuntum. Stadiums that are located in the city are Estádio Lino Correia and Estádio 24 de Setembro.

Religion 
The majority of the population of Bissau is with the majority being Muslims (50%), then Christians (34%) and animists (7.9%).

Places of Worship 
Among the places of worship, they are predominantly Muslim mosques. There are also some Christian churches and temples such as the Roman Catholic Diocese of Bissau (Catholic Church), Evangelical Churches, and the Universal Church of the Kingdom of God.

Notable people 
 

Benvindo António Moreira (born 1989), footballer

Gallery

International relations

Twin towns – Sister cities
Bissau is twinned with:
Águeda Municipality, Portugal
Dakar, Senegal
Chongqing, People's Republic of China
Agadir, Morocco
Havana, Cuba
Lisbon, Portugal
Lagos, Nigeria
Luanda, Angola
Taipei, Taiwan
Praia, Cape Verde
Ankara, Turkey
Sintra, Portugal

References

Further reading

External links

 
Populated places established in 1687
Former Portuguese colonies
Capitals in Africa
Populated places in Guinea-Bissau
Populated coastal places in Guinea-Bissau
Geba River
Regions of Guinea-Bissau
Sectors of Guinea-Bissau
1687 establishments in Portuguese Guinea
1687 establishments in Africa